Westview Community Cemetery is a historic African-American cemetery in Pompano Beach, Florida. 

It was created in 1952 during segregation when African-Americans could not be buried together with whites in Florida. the land for the cemetery was donated by Paul Hunter, Sr., a local businessman, to accommodate the interment of African-Americans in Pompano Beach. 

It is the final resting place of Esther Rolle (1920–1998), actress famous for the 1970s sitcom Good Times and her sister Estelle Evans (1906–1985), from the 1962 movie To Kill a Mockingbird. Rosanna Carter (1918–2016), stage and screen actress, is buried there as well.

Gallery

References

Buildings and structures in Pompano Beach, Florida
1952 establishments in Florida
Cemeteries in Florida
African-American history of Florida
African-American cemeteries